Yo Frankie is an album by the American musician Dion, released in 1989. The album marked a popular comeback for Dion, who had spent much of the 1980s recording Christian music. Lou Reed, who had inducted Dion into the Rock and Roll Hall of Fame a couple of months prior to the release of Yo Frankie, was one of the many musicians who made guest appearances on the album.

The album peaked at No. 130 on the Billboard 200. The lead single was "King of the New York Streets", which peaked at No. 74 on the UK Singles Chart in May 1989. "Written on the Subway Wall"/"Little Star" (featuring Paul Simon) peaked at No. 97 in October 1990.

Production 
The album was produced by Dave Edmunds. Dion cowrote many of its songs with the lyricist Bill Tuohy. Bryan Adams cowrote and produced "Drive All Night".

A music video for "And the Night Stood Still" and "Written on the Subway Wall" (with Paul Simon) aired on MTV and VH1.

In 2021, Dion released a blues version of "I've Got to Get to You" on his album Stomping Ground.

Critical reception 

Rolling Stone called the album "merely pleasant, just like most of DiMucci’s post-Sixties solo work," writing that "it comes with all the spineless instrumentation and ersatz-doo-wop harmonies of a Huey Lewis single."

The Ottawa Citizen thought that "every time the New Yorker returns, it is as a new rock and roll character, each more believable than the last and through each, offering a significant contribution to pop."

The Los Angeles Times wrote that "some of the tracks seem too polished and predictable, but the heart of the album—including the romantic innocence of 'And the Night Stood Still', the playful nostalgia of 'Written on the Subway Wall' and, especially, the wry introspection of 'King of the New York Streets'—bursts forth with a sense of triumph and survival."

The Chicago Tribune lamented the album's "overproduction," but wrote that the opening track's "combination of street-tough attitude wrapped in churning guitars and razor-sharp lyrics is riveting."

AllMusic wrote that "the album fits together so well and coherently that the contemporary and the nostalgic elements merge seamlessly into a pleasing whole."

Track listing

Personnel 
Dion - vocals, guitar
Bryan Adams - backing vocals
Phil Chen - bass
Dave Edmunds - production, guitar
Jim Horn - saxophone
k.d. lang - backing vocals
Chuck Leavell - keyboards
Lou Reed - backing vocals
Paul Simon - backing vocals
Patty Smyth - backing vocals
Terry Williams - drums

References 

Dion DiMucci albums
1989 albums
Arista Records albums